Lattice may refer to:

Arts and design
 Latticework, an ornamental criss-crossed framework, an arrangement of crossing laths or other thin strips of material
 Lattice (music), an organized grid model of pitch ratios
 Lattice (pastry), an ornamental pattern of crossing strips of pastry

Companies
 Lattice Engines, a technology company specializing in business applications for marketing and sales
 Lattice Group, a former British gas transmission business
 Lattice Semiconductor, a US-based integrated circuit manufacturer

Science, technology, and mathematics

Mathematics
 Lattice (group), a repeating arrangement of points
 Lattice (discrete subgroup), a discrete subgroup of a topological group whose quotient carries an invariant finite Borel measure
 Lattice (module), a module over a ring which is embedded in a vector space over a field
 Lattice graph, a graph that can be drawn within a repeating arrangement of points
 Lattice-based cryptography, encryption systems based on repeating arrangements of points
 Lattice (order), a partially ordered set with unique least upper bounds and greatest lower bounds
 Lattice-based access control, computer security systems based on partially ordered access privileges
 Skew lattice, a non-commutative generalization of order-theoretic lattices
 Lattice multiplication, a multiplication algorithm suitable for hand calculation

Other uses in science and technology
 Bethe lattice, a regular infinite tree structure used in statistical mechanics
 Crystal lattice or Bravais lattice, a repetitive arrangement of atoms
 Lattice C, a compiler for the C programming language
 Lattice mast, a type of observation mast common on major warships in the early 20th century
 Lattice model (physics), a model defined not on a continuum, but on a grid
 Lattice tower, or truss tower is a type of freestanding framework tower
 Lattice truss bridge, a type of truss bridge that uses many closely spaced diagonal elements

Other uses
 Lattice model (finance), a method for evaluating stock options that divides time into discrete intervals

See also
 Grid (disambiguation)
 Mesh (disambiguation)
 Trellis (disambiguation)